Strange Magic: The Best of Electric Light Orchestra is a compilation album by Electric Light Orchestra (ELO), released in 1995 only in the US.

The compilation favours album versions rather than single versions; tracks such as "Rock 'n' Roll Is King", "Shine a Little Love" and "Boy Blue" are longer. The compilation is sequenced chronologically and is drawn from US singles, but missing 3 from Xanadu, with exception of the European hit "Rockaria!" on disc one.

Track listing
All tracks written by Jeff Lynne, except disc 1, track 2, written by Chuck Berry (*2).

Personnel
Jeff Lynne - Vocals, guitars, keyboards
Bev Bevan - Drums, percussion
Richard Tandy - Keyboards, guitar
Kelly Groucutt - Bass, vocals (1974 onwards)
Michael d'Albuquerque - Bass (to 1974)
Mik Kaminski - Violin
Wilfred Gibson - Violin on "Roll Over Beethoven" and "Showdown"
Mike Edwards - Cello (to 1974)
Melvyn Gale - Cello (1974 onwards)
Hugh McDowell - Cello
Colin Walker - Cello on "Roll Over Beethoven" and "Showdown"
Marc Bolan - Guitar on "Ma-Ma-Ma Belle"
Roy Wood - Vocals, guitars, cello, bass, wind instruments on "10538 Overture"
Ira Robbins (Trouser Press) - Liner notes edited from Afterglow

See also
1995 in music

References 

1995 greatest hits albums
Albums produced by Jeff Lynne
Albums produced by Roy Wood
Electric Light Orchestra compilation albums